Asahel Hooker Lewis (Sept. 11, 1810-Sept. 25, 1862) was an American newspaper editor and politician.

He was the youngest son of Elias and Urania (Hooker) Lewis, of Farmington, Connecticut and was born in that town, Sept. 11, 1810.

He graduated from Yale College in 1833 and was a member of Skull and Bones.  After studying Law with Hon. W. L. Stores in Middletown, Connecticut, he removed to Cleveland, Ohio, in 1835, where he was for several years editor of the Cleveland Herald. He afterward
resided in Ravenna, Ohio and had charge of the Ohio Star.

In 1847 and 1848 he represented the counties of Summit and Portage in the Ohio State Legislature—and in 1848 removed to Cincinnati, where he remained eight years, and was associated with Hon. Henry Starr in the practice of Law. Then he removed to Akron, Ohio, and took the editorship of the Beacon, which he retained for a number of years. In the autumn of 1861 he went to St. Louis, and became one of the editors of the Missouri Democrat. His strength was unequal to his arduous labors, and he fell a victim to disease.  He died  in St. Louis, Mo, Sept. 25, 1862, aged 52 years.

He was married in 1843 to Miss Jennette, daughter of Christian Keene of Ravenna, and after her death, in 1848, to Miss Jane Platt.  He left a son and two daughters.

References

1810 births
1862 deaths
Yale College alumni
People from Farmington, Connecticut
American newspaper editors
Members of the Ohio General Assembly
19th-century American politicians